Vanja Marković (born 20 June 1994) is a Serbian professional footballer who plays as a defensive midfielder for Prva NL club Hrvatski Dragovoljac.

Club career
After joining Portuguese club Farense in July 2018, Marković left the club by mutual agreement on 13 March 2019. After Farense, he played in Hungary for Kaposvári Rákóczi and in Georgia for Torpedo Kutaisi.

On 11 February 2021, Marković signed with Bosnian Premier League club Sloboda Tuzla. He debuted in a league game against Olimpik on 8 March 2021.

In June 2021, he moved to Persiraja Banda Aceh in the Indonesian Liga 1. He made his professional debut for the club, in a 2–1 loss against Bhayangkara on 29 August 2021.

On 15 February 2022, Marković returned to Poland, signing a half-a-year deal with a two-year extension option with II liga side Ruch Chorzów.

International career
Marković made an appearance for the Serbia U19 national team in 2012.

References

External links

1994 births
Living people
Footballers from Belgrade
Serbian footballers
Serbia youth international footballers
Serbian expatriate footballers
Association football midfielders
Ekstraklasa players
Macedonian First Football League players
Liga Portugal 2 players
Nemzeti Bajnokság I players
Erovnuli Liga players
II liga players
Premier League of Bosnia and Herzegovina players
Liga 1 (Indonesia) players
Liga II players
Korona Kielce players
FK Vardar players
S.C. Farense players
Kaposvári Rákóczi FC players
FC Torpedo Kutaisi players
FK Sloboda Tuzla players
Persiraja Banda Aceh players
Ruch Chorzów players
ASC Oțelul Galați players
Expatriate footballers in Poland
Expatriate footballers in North Macedonia
Expatriate footballers in Portugal
Expatriate footballers in Hungary
Serbian expatriate sportspeople in Hungary
Expatriate footballers in Georgia (country)
Serbian expatriate sportspeople in Georgia (country)
Expatriate footballers in Bosnia and Herzegovina
Serbian expatriate sportspeople in Bosnia and Herzegovina
Expatriate footballers in Indonesia
Serbian expatriate sportspeople in Indonesia
Expatriate footballers in Romania 
Serbian expatriate sportspeople in Romania